The Kiss (also known as The May Irwin Kiss, The Rice-Irwin Kiss and The Widow Jones) is an 1896 film, and was one of the first films ever shown commercially to the public.  Around 18 seconds long, it depicts a re-enactment of the kiss between May Irwin and John Rice from the final scene of the stage musical The Widow Jones. The film was directed by William Heise for Thomas Edison. The film was produced in April 1896 at the Edison Studios of Edison, the first film studio in the United States. At the time, Edison was working at the Black Maria studios in West Orange, New Jersey.

In 1999, the short was deemed "culturally significant" by the United States Library of Congress and selected for preservation in the National Film Registry.

Cast
May Irwin as Widow Jones
John Rice as Billie Bikes

Production
The film was one of the last shot at Edison's Black Maria.

Release
According to Charles Musser the film was released in either April or May 1896, and was publicized in a sponsored article in the New York World about actors kissing on stage. The article discussed the controversy surrounding onstage kissing and, along with an illustration of the Irwin and Rice kiss, referred readers to The Widow Jones and the Edison film. The campaign sought to bring attention to the newspaper, play, and movie all at once. The film was shown during demonstrations of the Vitascope.

Charles Frohman was initially against the film, stating that "I shall have to consider replacing Miss Irwin" in The Widow Jones, but then asked for Edson Raff to have advertising for the short include that Irwin was the star of The Widow Jones.

The film was sold to exhibitors for $7.50 ($232 in 2020) and it was being shown at the end of almost every show by the fall of 1896.

Reaction
The film contained the very first kiss on film, with a close-up of a nuzzling duo followed by a short peck on the lips ("the mysteries of the kiss revealed"). The kissing scene was denounced as shocking and obscene to early moviegoers and caused the Roman Catholic Church to call for censorship and moral reform, as kissing in public at the time could lead to prosecution.

The film caused a scandalized uproar and occasioned disapproving newspaper editorials and calls for police action in many places where it was shown. One contemporary critic wrote, "The spectacle of the prolonged pasturing on each other's lips was beastly enough in life size on the stage but magnified to gargantuan proportions and repeated three times over it is absolutely disgusting."

However, according to Dengler (1979) in the Journal of Popular Film and Television, the shocked reaction of the general public is a myth.

The Edison catalogue advertised it this way: "They get ready to kiss, begin to kiss, and kiss and kiss and kiss in a way that brings down the house every time."

Perhaps in defiance, and "to spice up a film", this was followed by many kiss imitators and take-offs, including Something Good – Negro Kiss (1898), The Kiss in the Tunnel (1899) and The Kiss (1900).

Public exposure
For a number of years, it was believed that a showing of The Kiss was the first film publicly shown in Canada, projected in West End Park, Ottawa, on July 21, 1896.  It has since been learned that the competing Lumière Brothers Cinematograph had already exhibited different films in Montreal 24 days earlier, on June 27, 1896.

References

Works cited

Further reading
 Grahame-Smith, Seth. The Big Book of Porn. .

External links

 

 The Kiss at Library of Congress
 The Kiss video and biography of May Irwin
 The Kiss on YouTube
The Kiss essay by Daniel Eagan in America's Film Legacy: The Authoritative Guide to the Landmark Movies in the National Film Registry, Bloomsbury Academic, 2010 , pages 4–5 

1896 films
1890s American films
American silent short films
United States National Film Registry films
American black-and-white films
Films shot in New Jersey
Kissing
Films directed by William Heise
Articles containing video clips
Edison Manufacturing Company films
1890s romance films
American romance films
1896 short films
Obscenity controversies in film